Schlachtgeschwader 3 (SG 3) was a Luftwaffe close air support Geschwader during World War II. It was formed on 18 October 1943 in Eleusis from the Stab/Sturzkampfgeschwader 3. A special detachment was formed 13 June 1944 to 13 August 1944 referred to as Detachment Kuhlmey. The detachment was built around elements of I./SG 3, I./SG 5, II./JG 54 and NaGr.1

Commanding officers
 Oberst Kurt Kuhlmey, 18 October 1943 – 15 December 1944
 Major Bernhard Hamester, 15 December 1944 – 28 April 1945

See also
Organization of the Luftwaffe during World War II

References

Bibliography

 
 Bergström, Christer (2007c). Kursk - The Air Battle: July 1943. London: Chevron/Ian Allan. .
 Bergström, Christer (2008). Bagration to Berlin - The Final Air Battles in the East: 1944 - 1945. London: Ian Allan. .
 
 
 
 
 
 
 
 
 

Luftwaffe Wings
Military units and formations established in 1940
Military units and formations disestablished in 1943

Military units and formations established in 1943
Military units and formations disestablished in 1945